Aichi Prefectural Asahigaoka Senior High School (Japanese: 愛知県立旭丘高等学校) is a public coeducational senior high school located in Nagoya city, Aichi prefecture, Japan. It was originally established in 1870, having a long history of more than 140 years. As of 2019, it had about 1200 students in years 10 to 12. The school was named "Aichi Prefectural No.1 Middle School" before World War II. In 1948, following the reformation of the education system, the school was merged with Nagoya No.3 Girl High School and renamed as  "Aichi Prefectural Asahigaoka Senior High School".

School outline

Curriculum and Course 
Full-time Curriculum (2 courses)

 General Course
 Art Course

Half-day Curriculum (Night, 1 course) (Student admission will be closed for good from 2020)

 General Course

Motto 
Respect justice

Love sports

Be Constantly

School song 
The school's song was created by Kiyoshi Nobutoki and written by Japanese litterateur Senichi Hisamatsu, who was a graduate of the school. It was adopted in 1952.

Student clubs and extracurricular programs

Full-time Curriculum

Cultural Clubs 
 Astronomy club
 Band music club
 Electrical club
 Go and shogi club
 light music club
 Reading club
 Theater drama club
 String music club
 Photo club
 Calligraphy club
 Radio broadcasting club
 Biology club
 Chorus club
 Railway study club
 Film club
 Karuta club
 Mathematical Science club
 Quiz study club
 Fire Torch club
 E.S.S. (English Speaking society) club

Sports Clubs 
Baseball club
Soft baseball Club (Japanese version of baseball played with a hard rubber ball)
Tennis club (Boys and girls)
Soft tennis club (Boys and girls)
Volleyball club (Boys and girls)
Basketball club (man and woman)
Badminton club (Boys and girls)
Handball club (Boys and girls)
Rugby club
Soccer club (Boys and girls)
Dance club
Table tennis club
Judo club
Archery club
Kendo club
Athletics club
Rowing club
Swimming club
Wandervogel club

Half-time curriculum 
 Basketball club
 Badminton club

Notable people
Takeshi Uchiyamada
Akio Morita
Katō Takaaki
Futabatei Shimei
Tsubouchi Shōyō
Kohei Otsuka
Genpei Akasegawa
Miyoko Akaza
Masaki Tsuji
Kogo Noda
 Tsuneko Okazaki
Takashi Kawamura (politician) (mayor of Nagoya, 2009–present)

References

High schools in Aichi Prefecture
Art Deco architecture in Japan